The 2019 Guangzhou Charge season was the first season of Guangzhou Charge's existence in the Overwatch League as one of eight expansion franchises added for the 2019 season. The team had a subpar performance throughout the first three stages of the season, posting a 9–12 record through 21 matches with no stage playoff appearances. After the implementation of an enforced 2-2-2 role lock by the league, the Charge flourished, losing only one match in their final seven matches to give them a 15–13 record for the season. Finishing in 9th place in the overall standings, Guangzhou qualified for the Play-In Tournament, where they defeated the Chengdu Hunters in the first round, 4–1. However, they were unable to make it season playoffs, as they fell to the Seoul Dynasty by a score of 1–4 the following day.

Preceding offseason 
Charge acquired Choi "Hotba" Hong-Jun from Philadelphia Fusion on 17 October. In mid-November, Charge announced nine more players signed for their inaugural roster: 
Yiliang "Eileen" Ou,
Finley "Kyb" Adisi,
Lee "Happy" Jeong-woo,
Charlie "nero" Zwarg,
Oh "Rio" Seung-pyo,
Kim "shu" Jin-seo,
Kim "Chara" Jung-yeon,
Chen "Onlywish" Lizhen, and
Lee "Rise" Won-jae.

Charge signed Cho "J1N" Hyo-jin as the team's head coach on 3 December.

Regular season

Stage 1 
Charge opened their 2019 season on 15 February with a loss to fellow Chinese expansion franchise Chengdu Hunters. The team's first Overwatch League win came a week later in a 4–0 sweep over Dallas Fuel. Two days later, Charge lost in an overtime match to Vancouver Titans. Guangzhou took both of their matches week three over Florida Mayhem and Los Angeles Valiant to bring their record to 3–2. After dropping their week four match to Los Angeles Gladiators, Charge's final match of the stage was a rematch against Titans. Needing a win to secure a spot in the Stage 1 Playoffs, Charge was swept by Titans, ending the stage with a 3–4 record and out of playoff contention.

Stage 2 
Charge could not find much success in Stage 2. Charge did not find a single map victory through their first four matches of the stage, getting swept 0–4 in each match. Guangzhou found their first map win in week three against Hangzhou Spark, but Spark took the match 3–2. The team faced Atlanta Reign the following week. Charge found their first win of the stage, taking the match 3–1; with a combined total score of 33 points, the match became the highest scoring game in Overwatch League history. Charge took a win in their final match of the stage, defeating Houston Outlaws, and ending the stage with a disappointing 2–5 record.

Stage 3 
The Charge opened Stage 3 on 6 June strong with a 3–1 victory over the Chengdu Hunters. Two days later, they faced the Seoul Dynasty; Guangzhou was dominated throughout the match and was swept 0–4. The following week, the Charge took on the Los Angeles Valiant. The match was riddled with little mistakes by the Charge; that, and their inability to change strategies throughout, led to a 1–3 loss. Looking to rebound from the two straight losses, the Charge next took on the Toronto Defiant on 22 June. The Charge took the first map, Ilios in convincing fashion and carried that momentum throughout the match to sweep Toronto 4–0. The team's next match was against the Shanghai Dragons a week later; Charge lost the match 1–3. For the final week of Stage 3, Guangzhou headed to the Cobb Energy Performing Arts Centre in Atlanta to play at the "Atlanta Reign Homestand Weekend". Their first match at the homestand was, again, against the Dragons on 6 July. This time, the Charge took down the Dragons, winning 3–1. The following day, the team took on the Washington Justice. Guangzhou closed out the stage on a high note, as they dominated throughout the match and won 4–0.

Stage 4 
Prior to the start of Stage 4, which would include the implementation of an enforced 2-2-2 role lock by the League, the Charge made multiple roster moves. Guangzhou traded DPS Finley "Kyb" Adisi to the Philadelphia Fusion in exchange for tank Joona "Fragi" Laine on 17 July. The same day, the Charge acquired off-tank Kim "Bischu" Hyung-seok from the Los Angeles Gladiators in exchange for an undisclosed amount of cash.

The Charge's first match of Stage 4 was also against the Fusion on 25 July. After splitting the first four maps, the match went to a fifth tiebreaker map; Charge won the final map to claim a 3–2 match victory. Two days later, the team swept the Boston Uprising 4–0. In their first match of week two, Guangzhou faced the London Spitfire on 1 August. The Charge lost the first three maps, Lijiang Tower, Hanamura, Blizzard World but were able to win on the final map, Havana, resulting in a 1–3 loss. The team bounced back a day later, when they handily defeated the Hangzhou Spark 3–0. The team's next match was against the Seoul Dynasty on 8 August. After falling 0–2 going into halftime, the Charge responded by winning three straight maps to take a 3–2 win over the Dynasty. Three days later, the team faced the new York Excelsior. In the first map, Lijiang Tower, New York managed to take a point, but ultimately lost the map; that point was the only point the Charge would yield in the entire match, as Guangzhou won 4–0 in one of the most lopsided matches in the history of the Overwatch League. For their final regular season match, the Charge took on the Dallas Fuel on 18 August. Guangzhou closed out the regular season on a high note, sweeping the Fuel 4–0 in a match where an in-game bug cause an hour-long delay in the final map of the series – the longest delay in Overwatch League history.

Postseason 
With a 15–13 regular season record, the Charge finished in 9th place in the regular season standings, qualifying them for the Play-In Tournament. The team took on the twelfth-seeded Chengdu Hunters in the first round on 30 August. After winning the first two maps, Ilios and Eichenwalde, the Hunters closed the gap by taking map three, Horizon Lunar Colony. However, the Charge would not yield another map, taking the next two and winning the match 4–1.

Advancing to the next round, the Charge faced the eighth-seeded Seoul Dynasty the following day; the winner of the match would advance to the season playoffs. Guangzhou found themselves down 0–2 going into the match break, but started to find their footing as they were able to draw the third map, Horizon Lunar Colony. The found a win next map, Rialto, due in part to a strong performance from DPS Charlie "Nero" Zwarg. However, Seoul DPS duo Kim "Fleta" Byung-sun and Kim "Fits" Dong-eon took over the match in the following two maps, and the Charge lost the series 1–4.

Final roster

Transactions 
Transactions of/for players on the roster during the 2019 regular season:
On 17 July, Charge acquired Kim "Bischu" Hyung-seok from Los Angeles Gladiators.
On 17 July, Charge traded Finley "Kyb" Adisi to Philadelphia Fusion in exchange for Joona "Fragi" Laine.

Standings

Record by stage

League

Game log

Regular season

Playoffs

References 

2019 Overwatch League seasons by team
Guangzhou Charge
Guangzhou Charge seasons